Emanuel Kogutowicz,  (December 21, 1851, (Groß-)Seelowitz, Moravia – December 22, 1908, Budapest) was a Hungarian cartographer, and the founder of the Hungarian Geographical Institute.

Career 
After the Austro-Hungarian Compromise of 1867, the Kingdom of Hungary was able to partially re-establish its sovereignty and expanded its influence in public life and administration. The following year, the Elementary Education Act of 1868 was passed that required school attendance from ages 6 to 15, with a penalty for disobedience. The law also stipulated that students would be instructed in their own native languages. However there were no Hungarian-language maps or atlases available for elementary or secondary education. Kogutowicz published a small school atlas with 5 pages of maps of Budapest and the surrounding area. The initial atlas ('Small Atlas with a county map for 3rd grade pupils of elementary schools') was popular and Kogutowicz gradually added to it over the next ten years, totally to 13 pages. Kogutowicz was able to convince the Hungarian ministry of education, and the minister Albin Csáky, of the importance of a Hungarian cartography institute. The ministry subsequently placed an order for the school maps to come from Kogutowicz's institute in 1890, the same year it was founded. Much acclaimed in and out of Hungary, the atlases won a gold medal at the 1900 Paris Exposition. 

After the success of the school atlases, Kogutowicz's company, Kogutowicz & Co., established in 1892, was contracted by the Ministry of Defense in 1900 to supply military schools with atlases. Kogutowicz's son, Károly, also worked as a cartographer for the company and continued the business after his father's death.

References 

1851 births
1908 deaths
People from Židlochovice
People from the Margraviate of Moravia
Hungarian people of Czech descent
Hungarian people of Polish descent
Hungarian cartographers
19th-century Hungarian people